The Maukspitze is a mountain peak in the Kaisergebirge range of the Northern Limestone Alps. It is 2,231 meters above the Adriatic, making it the ninth tallest peak in the Kaisergebirge.

Location 
The Maukspitze is the easternmost independent summit of the Kaisergebirge mountains. To the east is the crest of the Niederkaiser, to the west the Maukspitze borders on the Ackerlspitze. To the south, the Maukspitze falls steeply and abruptly (Niedersessel, Hochsessel), in places with vertical rock faces, into the Leukental towards St. Johann in Tirol. To the north the Maukspitze drops equally sharply into the Kaiserbach valley.

Routes 
The Maukspitze is a popular viewing point due to its exposed situation, but is not easy to reach from any side. The simplest climb runs from the Wochenbrunneralm in the south via Niedersessel and Südostgrat (I). The Maukspitze is also accessible via a marked but exposed path from the Ackerlspitze. Both of these climbs start from the Ackerl Hut. There are many climbing routes of various grades.

Photos

External links 
 Tour description with photos 
 Tour description with photos 

Mountains of the Alps
Mountains of Tyrol (state)
Two-thousanders of Austria
Kaiser Mountains